Tanette was an Indonesian monarchy founded around 1547.

Rulers 
Puange 1547?-?
Datu Gollaya Lamarumpia ?-?
Topalannyari ?-?
Lamamula Daeng Limba ?-?
Daeng Ibrahim ?-?
Mapatjantji Daeng Matayan Matinrowe ri Sombapopa ?-?
Paketana Datu Mario Matinrowe ri Tanette ?-?
Battara Tunka Datu ri Luwu Datu Mario Karaeng Patiru ....-1735
Laodan Yusuf Fakhr ed Din Matinrowe ri Musuna 1735-1747
Tanrelile 1747-1768
Abd el Kadir Mohidin Matinrowe ri Dusang 1768-1807
Abdallah Saipu Aru Pantjana Lapatua 1807–1824, 1824-1825 and 1827-1840
Daeng Tanisanga 1824 and 1825-1827
Datu Mario La Rumpang La Combong Matinrowe ri Mutiara 1841–1855, Datu of Marioriwawo 1844–1855. Son of La Rumpang, Datu of Marioriwawo and brother or husband of:
Siti Aisyah We Tenriolle 1855–1898, Datin of Marioriwawo 1855-1898

....

Datin Pateka Tana, Tanra Lipue, Aru Lalolang alias Pettekketana Aru Lalolang 1926-1927
Andi Baso 1927-abdicated 1950. Son of a brother of Datin Pettekketana Aru Lalolang
Andi Iskandar, temporary ruler 1950–1960. Grandson of Datin Pettekketana Aru Lalolang

Precolonial states of Indonesia
States and territories established in 1547
1547 establishments in Asia